Tracie Bennett (born 17 June 1961) is an English singer and stage and television actress. She trained at the Italia Conti Academy of Theatre Arts in Clapham, London. She played the role of Sharon Gaskell in Coronation Street from 1982 to 1984, returning to the role in 1999 and again in 2021.

Best known for her roles in theatre, both dramatic and musical, Bennett has received two Olivier Awards for Best Supporting Role in a Musical for her performances in the musicals She Loves Me and Hairspray with additional nominations for her work in High Society and Follies. Bennett was also nominated for the Olivier Award for Best Actress in a Musical for Mrs Henderson Presents while her performance as Judy Garland in End of the Rainbow earned her an Olivier nomination for Best Actress in a Play and a Tony Award nomination in the same category when the production transferred to Broadway.

Career
Bennett's first major television role was in Coronation Street between 1982 and 1984 as Sharon Gaskell, the Faircloughs' foster daughter. She returned to the role in 1999. She played dim-witted blonde Tracy Glazebrook in the pilot of Steven Moffat's sitcom Joking Apart (1991), a role which she reprised for the subsequent two full-length series in 1993 and 1995. She played Shirley's rebellious daughter Millandra in the film version of Shirley Valentine (1989). She appeared in She Loves Me at the Savoy Theatre in 1994, for which she won the Laurence Olivier Award as Best Supporting Performance in a Musical. She played Ida in Honk!, which won the 2000 Olivier Award for Best Musical.

In 2003, she was praised for her role in the London production of High Society, for which she was nominated for an Olivier Award in 2004. She appeared in Sex, Chips and Rock 'n' Roll at the Royal Exchange Theatre in Manchester in 2005, for which she won a TMA Award for Best Supporting Performance in a Musical. In January 2006, Bennett joined the West End production of Les Misérables in the role of Madame Thénardier at the Queen's Theatre, which she continued to play to July 2007. In October 2007, she began her run in the role of Velma Von Tussle in the London premiere of the musical Hairspray at the Shaftesbury Theatre.  She mentioned on a televised interview Alan Titchmarsh that it was a "great show" and that she enjoyed doing it, but also said it was exhausting, pointing out that to begin with, the wiring under her wig weighs 10 lbs, making some of the dancing difficult. In spite of this, her efforts were rewarded in March 2008, when she received her second Olivier Award for Best Supporting Performance in a Musical for her performance.

In February 2010, Bennett took on the role of Judy Garland in the first London production of Peter Quilter's play End of the Rainbow. The production premiered with at Northampton's Royal Theatre, and subsequently transferred to London's West End. Bennett received an Olivier Award nomination for Best Actress for her performance. The production transferred to Broadway in March 2012, with Bennett reprising her role. For her performance in the Broadway production, Bennett received a Tony Award nomination for Best Leading Actress in a Play, and won the Outer Critics Circle Award and Drama Desk Award for Outstanding Actress in a Play. In 2013, she joined the cast of detective series Scott & Bailey as Sharon, the estranged mother of DC Bailey. In 2015 and 2016, she played Laura Henderson in the musical Mrs Henderson Presents and received a nomination for the Olivier Awards 2016 in the category Best Actress in a Musical.

Between 2014 and 2017 she played patient Molly Drover in the BBC medical drama, Casualty. In 2017, she played the role of Carlotta in the National Theatre production of Follies by Stephen Sondheim, singing the song "I'm Still Here". In March 2021, it was announced that Bennett would be returning to Coronation Street reprising her role as Sharon Bentley after 22 years away.

Filmography

Film

Television

Theatre

Awards and nominations

Stage

References

External links
 
 
 
 
Les Misérables Extensive list of credits
 
 Interview with Tracie Bennett, westendtheatre.com; accessed 2 May 2015.

1961 births
Living people
English television actresses
English stage actresses
English musical theatre actresses
Alumni of the Italia Conti Academy of Theatre Arts
People from Leigh, Greater Manchester
Theatre World Award winners
Laurence Olivier Award winners